Daniel Bruce Forsman (born July 15, 1958) is an American professional golfer who played on the PGA Tour and who now plays on the Champions Tour.

Early years
Forsman was born in Rhinelander, Wisconsin. however his family relocated to Mountain View, California where he grew up.  He learned to play golf at Los Altos Golf and Country Club and spent summers caddying for club members. He attended Awalt High School (currently Mountain View High School) where he lettered on both the golf and basketball teams. He attended Arizona State University majoring in Communications.  While at ASU, he was also on the golf team.

Professional career
Forsman turned professional in 1982. He earned his PGA Tour card at Qualifying School at the TPC Sawgrass in Ponte Vedra Beach, Florida in the fall of 1982 and joined the PGA Tour in 1983.  A five-time winner on the PGA Tour, Forsman finished in the top-125 every year from 1983 until 2003 with the exception of one year. His best overall season was 1992, when he finished 10th on the money list with a win and three second-place finishes. He lost his card in 2004, but continued to play relatively well during his late forties.

After reaching the age of 50 in July 2008, Forsman began play on the Champions Tour. He won his first title in this venue in his rookie year at the 2009 AT&T Champions Classic where he shot a final round of 6 under par, came from 5 shots back, and defeated Don Pooley in a playoff with a birdie on the first playoff hole. His second win came a year later at the Regions Charity Classic. His third win came at the 2012 Mitsubishi Electric Championship at Hualalai.

Personal life
Forsman is married to the former Trudy Holley. They settled in Provo, Utah, where they raised their two sons Richard and Thomas.

Professional wins (9)

PGA Tour wins (5)

*Note: The 1986 Hertz Bay Hill Classic was shortened to 54 holes due to weather.

PGA Tour playoff record (1–1)

Other wins (1)

Champions Tour wins (3)

Champions Tour playoff record (1–0)

Results in major championships

CUT = missed the half-way cut
"T" = tied

Summary

Most consecutive cuts made – 11 (1991 PGA – 1996 PGA)
Longest streak of top-10s – 2 (1992 PGA – 1993 Masters)

Results in The Players Championship

CUT = missed the halfway cut
WD = withdrew
"T" indicates a tie for a place

Results in World Golf Championships

"T" = Tied

See also
1982 PGA Tour Qualifying School graduates
List of golfers with most PGA Tour wins

References

External links

American male golfers
Arizona State Sun Devils men's golfers
PGA Tour golfers
PGA Tour Champions golfers
Golfers from Wisconsin
Golfers from California
Golfers from Utah
People from Rhinelander, Wisconsin
Sportspeople from Provo, Utah
1958 births
Living people